Eastland is an unincorporated community in San Juan County, Utah, United States.

References

Unincorporated communities in San Juan County, Utah
Unincorporated communities in Utah